Arrowfield Stud is a thoroughbred stud farm comprising 2,500 acres in the fertile Segenhoe Valley, near Scone in the Upper Hunter Valley.  Established in 1985, Arrowfield Stud is the largest Australian owned thoroughbred stud and currently stands 11 stallions including the two-time champion sire Snitzel.

Arrowfield Stud was established by current owner, former stockbroker John Messara, an Australian with Mediterranean heritage, who migrated to Sydney as a child.

Stallions standing at Arrowfield (2019)

References

Horse farms in Australia